Fuente de Pedro Naharro is a municipality in Cuenca, Castile-La Mancha, Spain. It has a population of 1,211.

Municipalities in the Province of Cuenca